The Korean National Police Agency (KNPA), also known as the Korean National Police (KNP), is one of the national police organizations in South Korea. It is run under the Ministry of the Interior and Safety. Its headquarters is 97, Tongil-ro, Seodaemun, Seoul. The agency is divided into 18 local police agencies, including the Seoul Metropolitan Police Agency. Local police agencies are not independent of the national police.

The spiritual origins of Korean Police organization date to the Police Department of Provisional Government of the Republic of Korea. After the end of the decades-long Japanese colonial rule, the United States Army Military Government in Korea (USAMGIK) created a police administration bureau under U.S. military governance, and established a police department in every province, relying upon the police from the Japanese colonial era to maintain law and order. The present-day agency was created in 1991, reshuffling the National Security Headquarters in the Ministry of Home Affairs to the National Police Agency.

History

Before 1945 

The origins of the Korean Police organization is the Police Department of the Provisional Government of the Republic of Korea. The bylaws of the Korean Provisional Government promulgated on April 25, 1919, stipulated the roles and responsibilities of the Police Bureau under the Provisional Government. The first Commissioner General of the Police Bureau was Kim Gu, who laid the foundation for the Korean police force. Police of the Provisional Government guarded key figures in the government and government office building, as well as maintaining public security in the oversea Koreans society.

In 1923, Kim Gu established the neighborhood patrol force in the Shanghai group of overseas Koreans. Its mission was to maintain public security in the Korean society of Shanghai. This organization was later renamed to the Korean Patriotic Organization, a secret organization that aimed to assassinate prominent Japanese figures of the Empire of Japan.

1945–1948: Period of the Police Administration Department 
On August 15, 1945, Japan surrendered control over Korea and the southern part was occupied by the United States and established the United States Army Military Government in Korea. Under the U.S. military government, the Police Administration Bureau (Hanja: 警務部) was established, directed by Lawrence E. Schick, and established a police department in every province in 21 October. This police organization was formed with 2,000 officers, most were former police in the Japanese colonial government. The first Korean Director of the National Police Department was Chough Pyung-ok, with his term beginning on 21 October.

In 1946, the Police Administration Bureau (Hanja: 警務部) was promoted into the Department of Police Affairs. In March 5, the police department launched the Railway Provincial Police Division, which was eventually abolished in 1949. During this period, Korean police were deployed to conflicts such as the Autumn Uprising of 1946 and the Jeju uprising between 1948 and 1949.  The First Republic of Korea was founded on 15 August 1948 after the transfer from the United States Army Military Government and Syngman Rhee became the first President of Korea following the May 1948 general election. The Bureau of National Security is established under the Minister of the Internal Affair.

1948–1974: Period of the Bureau of National Security 
On 14 November 1948, the Bureau of National Security is established after the transfer from the United States Police Administration Department. On November 18, the police agency is established in every South Korea city and province.

When the Korean War broke out in 1950, Korean police were engaged in the war. The Police Battle Force headquarters was established in Taebaek and Jiri Mountain. On 25 June 1950, around 3:00 AM, a police officer of Gangneung city, Jeon Daeuk, became the first combat casualty of the Korean War. In the whole period of the war, 10,618 officers were killed and 6,760 were injured. Some police engaged in wartime massacres, like Bodo League massacre. Kim Tae Sun, the chief of the Seoul Metropolitan Police, admitted to personally executing at least 12 "communists and suspected communists" after the outbreak of the war.

After the Korean War armistice was signed on 27 July 1953. On 14 December 1953, the Policeman's Duties Execution Law was established, which regulated the duties of Korean police officers.

In 1955, the National Institute of Scientific Inspection Service is established, now known as the National Forensic Service. In 1967, the Combat Police Squads are launched in every city and province.

In 1972, the Police Special Academy was upgraded into the National Police College (not to be confused with the Korean National Police University).

On 24 December 1974, due to the new Government Organization Act, the Commissioner General of the Headquarter of National Security(Hanja: 治安本部) was upgraded to the status of a government position and elevated the head of department into the position of a government official.

1974–1991: Period of the National Security Headquarters 

On 24 December 1974, the Bureau of National Security was upgraded to the Headquarter of National Security, independent to the Minister of Internal Affairs. At the same time, as part of the reforms for the organizations of the National Security Headquarter, police abolished the Director General for Public Peace and Defense and installed the first, the second, the third department. In this period, South Korea president Park Chung-hee assumed dictatorial power in the October Restoration and took emergency measures. Korean police clashed with leading opposition members and protesters, like in the Bu-Ma Democratic Protests.

On 26 October 1979, Park Chung-hee, the third President of South Korea, was assassinated. On 12 December, Republic of Korea Army Major General Chun Doo-hwan, commander of the Security Command, seized power in the coup d'état of December Twelfth. Next year, military power forced the Cabinet to extend martial law to the whole nation. In the city of Gwangju, protestors gathered to protest against the authoritarian government in the Gwangju Uprising. Initially, the South Korean police were deployed against the protests. An Boeng-ha, Commissioner General of the Jeonnam Provincial Police Agency, rejected the order of the military regime to shoot citizens. He was removed from his position and tortured by the Army Counterintelligence Corps (today the Defense Security Command).

In 1982, police increased the number of security personnel by 3,292 due to the dismissal of curfews, abolished the National Police College Vice President system, and replaced the Deputy Dean of the National Police College with the Director General of the Faculty, Superintendent General.

On January 21, 1984, the first 12 Combat Police Corps are recruited. The same day, 88 Olympic Expressway (today Gwangju–Daegu Expressway) police personnel were recruited. In 1987, this combat squard are increased to five special mobile police forces, two mobile police forces and one airport defense company.

In 1987, Park Jong-chol, the president of the student council in the linguistics department of Seoul National University, was detained during an investigation into against Chun Doo-hwan's dictatorship and the aftermath of the 1980 Gwangju Massacre activities. Park refused to confess the whereabouts of one of his fellow activists.  During the interrogation, authorities used waterboarding techniques to torture him, eventually leading to his death on 14 January 1987. Information surrounding the events of Park Jong-chol's death was initially suppressed. However, the Catholic Priests Association for Justice (CPAJ), revealed the truth to the public on 18 May, further inflaming public sentiment. CPAJ planned a June 10 demonstration in his honor. Due to this movement, called the June Struggle, the military regime of President Chun Doo-hwan and Roh Tae-woo acceded to the key demands of direct presidential elections and restoration of civil liberties.

In 1990, due to Presidential Decree No. 12931, recruitment of police officers was increased by 2,133 including 1,256 C3 patrol officers.

After 1991: Organized as the National Police Agency 
On 24 July 1991, as proclaimed by Presidential Decree No. 13431, the National Police Agency and its affiliated organizations were organized. On 26 July, the revised Government Organization Act (Law No. 4268) legislated the Police Law (Law No. 4369), organized the National Police Agency and other affiliated organizations (Presidential Decree No. 13431), regulated operations of the Police Committee (Presidential Decree No. 13432) and adjusted the capacity of police organizations. On 31 July, the Korea Coast Guard was organized by Presidential Decree No. 13431. The Headquarter of National Security was renamed to the National Police Agency on 1 August.

In 1995, police substation and police box names were integrated into police offices. The National Police Agency and the affiliated organizations were recognized by Presidential Decree No. 14823.

On 8 August 81996, the National Police Agency and the affiliated organizations were reorganized (Presidential Decree No. 15136) in accordance with the transference of the position of the National Maritime Police Agency to the Ministry of the Maritime Affairs and Fisheries.

On 29 September 2000, the Korean National Police Agency established the Anti Cyber Terrorism Center, divided into four teams: the Co-operative Operation Team, the Report and Warning Team, the Inspection Service Team, and the Skill-Development Team.

On 27 March 2001, in order to enforce the Regulation on the National Police Agency and affiliated organization, Administration Order No. 128, the Incheon International Airport Police Squad under the Incheon Metropolitan Police Agency was established. Also, the Gimpo International Airport Police Squad was renamed to the Gimpo Airport Police Squad of Seoul Metropolitan Police Agency.

In 2006, Jeju Province became a Self-Governing Province. For this reason, the Korean National Police Agency and the affiliated organizations (Presidential Decree No. 19588) was recognized. Operation regulations (Ministry of Government Affairs and Home Affairs Decree No. 338) were amended. The Jeju Local Police Agency was changed to Jeju Special Self-Governed Local Police Agency according to the Jeju Special Self-Governing Law.

In 2013, The Korean government organized the National Police Agency and the affiliated organizations by the Presidential Decree No. 24972. The Government Officials Act was enforced (No. 11530, enforced on 12 December 2012) that abolished contracted public officials etc. from the occupational categories of public officials and reduced the scope of public officials in special services. This change was reflected in the Organization of the National Police Agency and the affiliated organizations.

Organization 

The Korean National Police Agency consists of one Deputy Commissioner General, eight bureaus, nine offices and thirty-two divisions. The Spokesperson (Director for Public Relations Division) is directly attached to the Commissioner General of the police. The nine offices are the Spokesperson's Office, the Planning and Coordination Office, the Police Administration and Human Resources Office, the Audit and Inspection Office, the ICT and Equipment Policy Office, the Scientific Investigation Office, and the Police Situation Control Center. The eight bureaus are Community Safety, Investigation Bureau, Traffic and Foreign Affairs Bureau, Public Security, Intelligence and National Security Bureaus.

Also, the Korean police have several affiliated institutions, including the Korean National Police University, Police Training Institute, Central Police Academy, Korean Police Investigation Academy and the National Police Hospital.

The Korean National Police is regionally divided over the 18 metropolitan cities and provinces, placing 255 stations, 518 precincts and 1,433 police boxes under metropolitan and provincial police agencies.

The regional headquarters are as follows:

 Seoul Metropolitan Police Agency
 Busan Metropolitan Police Agency
 Daegu Metropolitan Police Agency
 Incheon Metropolitan Police Agency
 Gwangju Metropolitan Police Agency
 Daejeon Metropolitan Police Agency
 Ulsan Metropolitan Police Agency
 Gyeonggi Bukbu Provincial Police Agency
 Gyeonggi Nambu Provincial Police Agency
 Gangwon Provincial Police Agency
 Chungbuk Provincial Police Agency
 Chungnam Provincial Police Agency
 Sejong Provincial Police Agency
 Jeonbuk Provincial Police Agency
 Jeonnam Provincial Police Agency
 Gyeongbuk Provincial Police Agency
 Gyeongnam Provincial Police Agency
 Jeju Special Self-Governing Provincial Police Agency

Academic organization 

The Korea Police Agency have an academic organization for law enforcement education, Korean National Police University. Before enrolling in the school, the National Police University provides freshmen with a two-week orientation program to help them understand the organization of the university and the police. Freshmen are given insights on the police and the police university by participating in introductory programs such as the university curriculum, campus life, and lectures titled "History of the Police and the Police University" and "Future-oriented Ways as a Police Officer". Four majors of police law, criminal investigation, police administration, and 30 credits need to be taken for each course.

Training is undertaken at the Central Police Academy and Police Human Resources Development Institute. The Central Police Academy is specialist academic organization for new police officers. New enrolled police officers of all genders complete a 34-week program. The Police Human Resources Development Institute, which was previously called the Police Comprehensive Academy, was split from the Police University in 1984. In 2018, the Police Comprehensive Academy was renamed to the Police Human Resources Development Institute.

The Korean Police Investigation Academy is an academic organization for police officers to undertake training for the investigation bureau. When freshman police officers enroll in the investigation bureau, they need to complete the 63-task course.

Special Operations Unit (SOU) 
The KNP SOU, formerly known as KNP SWAT before it changed its name, is a specialized unit to perform dangerous operations. The unit's main mission is counter-terrorism, but it also can include serving high-risk arrest warrants, performing hostage rescue and/or armed intervention, and engaging heavily armed criminals.

 Seoul Police Agency (Unit 868): 4 squadrons
 Busan Police Agency (Unit 431): 1 squadron
 Daegu Police Agency: 1 squadron
 Incheon Police Agency (Unit 313): 1 squadron
 Gwangju Police Agency: 1 squadron
 Gyeonggi Bukbu Police Agency: 1 squadron
 Gyeonggi Nambu Police Agency: 1 squadron
 Chungnam (South Chungcheong) Police Agency: 1 squadron
 Jeonnam (South Jeolla) Police Agency: 1 squadron
 Gyeongnam (South Gyeongsang) Police Agency: 1 squadron
 Jeju Police Agency: 1 squadron

Tourist Police 
The Korea Tourist Police of Seoul was launched in October 2013. Tourist Police offers diverse public order and security services for tourists. The Korea Tourist Police is affiliated with the Metropolitan Police Agencies in Seoul, Busan, and Incheon. , Tourist Police centers were set up in the Seoul Myeongdong, Dongdaemun, and Itaewon, Busan Nampo-dong, Incheon International Airport.

Combat police (existed) 

The Combat Police division of the National Police Agency is an anti-riot paramilitary unit, of military conscripts. Its members deal with counterintelligence and riot policing. It was established in 1967, during the Third Republic. Each battalion is assigned to a municipal police agency in the country. In their riot gear, they were once  identified by their signature metal riot shields which are numbered such as "1001" or "1011", and on their helmets with the NPA emblem. Now the police use modern tactical clear plastic shields and now deploy high-powered water cannons to minimize civilian injuries.  Two weeks of training are taken by each draftee.

Instances of police brutality have in the past been raised against the South Korean anti-riot units in particular, by the Asian Human Rights Commission, citing police actions of a "brutal and violent manner" that cause deaths among protesters, including Jeon Young-Cheol on 24 November 2005. The South Korean President, Roh Moo Hyun, later apologised for this violence. The police force themselves reported that 117 officers were injured against 70 protesters, after being hit "with shards of broken bottles and flower vases". Injuries to the riot police officers have themselves become reason for protest, with one in every 53 officers being injured in 2005, the number of injuries having raised to 893 from 331 in 2000. Then, on 26 December 2011, 3,211 riot police were finally evacuated and abolished on 25 September 2013. Relevant tasks, including the suppression of protests by the combat police, were transferred to the Republic of Korea Auxiliary Police.

Symbol 

The symbol of the Korean National Police (KNP), which was newly created on the occasion of the 60th anniversary of their founding in 2006, takes the shape of Steller's sea eagle flying up to the sky with holding the rose of Sharon. Steller's sea eagle, the scales on the neck, and the rose of Sharon represents "police", "balance" and "the state and the people" respectively.

On the shoulders of the eagle, there are a scale and a balance beam to configure the shape of balance, and stress "fairness." The taegeuk sign in the middle of the rose of Sharon is the origin of all things and signifies "the Republic of Korea and its people"

The badge consists of two overlapping circles. The lower circle with a Taegeuk surrounded by other five Taegeuks engraved represents Mugunghwa. Each part of the badge represents as follows: The front circle represents "the sun or light." The Mugunghwa represents "the nation and people." The back circle represents "the moon or shade."

Ranks 

Commissioner General is Chief of the Korean Police at most one may be appointed at a time. Chief Superintendent General are Deputy Chief of National Police Agency, Chief of local police agencies in Seoul, Busan, Gyeonggi and Incheon Province, Equivalent to dean of National Police College.

Newly commissioned officers are appointed as Policeman Assistant(순경시보) for a one-year probationary period. The uniform and insignia of an assistant is identical to those of a Policeman.

In Jeju Special Self-Governing Provincial Police Agency, prefix of all rank is 'Self-Governing' such as "Self-Governing Police Officer".

Equipment

Vehicles 
Police cars used by the National Police Agency include the semi-mid-size Hyundai Elantra, mid-size Hyundai Sonata and SsangYong Korando C SUV. On average, there are two or three police cars in each police district, though there can be up to seven in busy areas. Motorcycles in the 1,170–1,690cc range are used for traffic operations.

South Korean police also use police buses. Currently used models are the Hyundai Universe and Hyundai Super Aero City, but all bus models will change to hydrogen vehicle like the Hyundai Elec-city Hydrogen electric vehicle.

South Korean police uses various helicopters such as Bell 412, Bell 206L-3, AgustaWestland AW119 Koala, AgustaWestland AW109C, Bell 212, KAI KUH-1 Surion and Mil Mi-172.

Weapons 
Former service handgun for Korean National Police Agency were Smith & Wesson K-frame .38 cal revolvers including Model 10 and Model 19. In mid 2000s, Smith & Wesson Model 60 chambered in .38 Special caliber became new sidearm for police officers. Additionally, police officers also utilize less-lethal weapons such as police batons and 5kV Tasers.

Reform and debate in police system

Autonomous Police System 
The Autonomous Police System is one in which local governments are responsible for the installation, maintenance, and operation of police. In this system, The autonomous police mainly carry out life safety and crime prevention tasks, while the national police carry out the work on a national scale. This system is based on some legislation. Paragraph 1 of Article 117 of the South Korean constitution clarifies that the local governments are based on constitutional values, by stating local governments shall deal with administrative matters pertaining to the welfare of local residents, manage properties, and may enact provisions relating to local autonomy, within the limit of Acts and subordinate statutes.

In June 2006, Jeju Island started the autonomous police, but this police does not have authority to investigate. In 2018, It was discussed that introduction of the autonomous police would become nationwide. The autonomous police system has already been in effect on Jeju Island since 2006, and starting this year, it will be piloted in five cities and provinces, including Seoul and Sejong, and will gradually expand nationwide and go into full operation in 2020.

Investigation Authority 
In history, Korean criminal procedure system is concentrated to prosecutor authority. Warrant is only issued by request of prosecutor. Many criticisms of this system have been raised. One of the alternative systems is reform of the criminal investigation authority.

In 1990, first debate of revision of investigation authority was started, but adjustment failed by gap of the Police and Prosecutors' Office. In 2011, revision of criminal procedure law recognized the authority of start and processing investigation to Police office, but executive order of investigation authority range of prosecutor reinforced power to prosecutor office. In 2019, collaboration relation adjustment of police office and prosecutor in investigation was sent to legislation commission.

Cooperation with other countries 
The Korean Police Agency cooperates with law enforcement organizations of other countries. In 2015, the Korean Police Agency create the "K-police Wave Center" for exchange of police to other countries. Starting in 2016, Korean police began sending personnel and equipment to abroad police agencies. By 2019, this exchange has increased the eight-times compared to 2012. Typical countries include the United Arab Emirates, Chile, Vietnam and Guatemala. In 2019, the Seoul International National Commissioner General Conference was opened on the same day as the agency's 74-year anniversary. Participants of the conference included diplomats from 29 countries, including the United States, China and Russia.

In addition, the Korean National Police has exchange agreements with European and North American law enforcement agencies. In 2015, the KNP concluded a cyber crime investigation cooperation MOU with the America Federal Bureau of Investigation (FBI). In 2019, KNP dispatched officers to Croatia for tourism safety programs. In the "Croatia-South Korea Tourism safety cooperation MOU", six South Korean police officers patrolled Zagreb and Dubrovnik with Croatian police.

Public safety 

South Korea has a lower crime rate than comparable industrialized countries. South Korea is considered one of the world's safest tourist destinations, with low crime rates and essentially no history of terrorist activity other than by the North. By this system, South Korean successful and safety open the international event like the 2018 Winter Olympics.

See also 
 Law enforcement in South Korea
 Republic of Korea Auxiliary Police

References

Further reading

External links 

  
  

National Central Bureaus of Interpol
Government agencies of South Korea
Law enforcement in South Korea
National law enforcement agencies of South Korea
Seodaemun District